Ivana is a female given name.

Ivana may also refer to:
 Ivana (singer) (born 1969), Bulgarian pop-folk singer
 Ivana (actress), Indian actress
 Ivana Alawi (born 1996) Filipino actress
 Ivana, Batanes, a municipality in the Philippines
 Ivana Helsinki, a Finnish fashion company
 Ivana Las Vegas, a cancelled high-rise condominium project by Ivana Trump
 Milan Ivana (born 1983), Slovak footballer

See also
 Ivan (disambiguation)
 Iwana (disambiguation)